Francis (Frank) W. Hastings (November 12, 1848 – February 9, 1935) was an American politician in the state of Washington. He served in the Washington State Senate from 1891 to 1895.

References

Republican Party Washington (state) state senators
1848 births
1935 deaths
Politicians from Portland, Oregon